Nonsuch High School is an all-girls' grammar school with an academy status, located in Cheam, in the borough of Epsom and Ewell in Surrey, England, on the border of the London Borough of Sutton, and standing in  of grounds on the edge of Nonsuch Park. The school is a specialist science college and languages school and is currently ranked as the 9th best performing state school by GCSE results in 2019. Nonsuch High School for Girls also ranked in 13th highest place nationally for the value added progress their students make at GCSE according to the Department for Education's (DFE) performance tables.

History 
The school was founded in 1938. The first headmistress was Marion Dickie who stayed on as headmistress until 1964. Nonsuch holds two entrance examinations which must be passed in order to go to the school. This examination system was first introduced on 21 December 1937 and continues to this day.

Awards
The school has won various awards such as Beacon status, Sportsmark Award, Schools Achievement Award and Education Extra - Distinction. It also gained specialist science college status in July 2004 and then language school status. This means extra funding was provided. Every year, along with St Philomena's Catholic High School for Girls, Nonsuch provides the ball girls for the Queen's Club Championships as well as providing ballgirls for the ATP tournament. The school was awarded academy status on 1 June 2011.

Selection
As Nonsuch is a grammar school, girls are required to take the 11+ exam to gain entry into year 7, which used to be a shared selection test with Wallington High School for Girls, but was made separate in 2009, and then in 2016 they were recombined. However, there are sometimes additional places in other year groups, and these are allocated based on tests in English, Mathematics and Science. There is another intake for the sixth form, which is based on GCSE results. An average points score of 50 points and a grade B or above in GCSE Mathematics and English Language is needed for this.

The Nonsuch catchment area is defined by a circle with a radius of 5.25 km from the front door of the school.

80 places are awarded each year to those with the highest scores in the Entrance Test, whether they live inside or outside the catchment area.

Those who pass the test and live within the circle on the cut-off date as defined by the Pan-London Co-ordinated Admissions System are ranked according to the score they achieve. Places are initially allocated according to the ranked order. If however, two or more girls have the same score and fewer places are available, the place or places will be offered to the girl or girls who live nearer to the school.

The Year 7 selection test consists of two papers, Maths and English, with a short break between them. The pass mark for admission to Year 7 in 2010 was 202.

Astronomy
The school has an observatory on the roof where the astronomy society frequently meets. The school has two teachers for this GCSE. In 2008 all 5 students achieved either an A or A* grade. The Epsom and Ewell Astronomical society meet at the school observatory once a month.

Notable former pupils

 Joanna Rowsell Shand, Olympic cycling champion  (2000–2007)
 Elizabeth Kay, author of books such as: The Divide trilogy(1960–67)
 Katie Melua, singer-songwriter
 Melanie South, tennis player
 Susan Lalic (née Walker), British Ladies chess champion.
 Christina Lamb, war correspondent, author of seven books including The Africa House and I Am Malala.
 Carrie Quinlan, British actress, comedy writer and journalist.
 Suzannah Lipscomb, British historian and television presenter. Reflecting on her days at Nonsuch in 2022, she said "It was completely part of the culture that there was an older girl that you had a crush on and that was for everybody, no matter. Though many people ended up not identifying themselves as being gay."
 Lolly Adefope, comedian and actor.

References

External links
 The Nonsuch website
 Nonsuch Managed Learning Environment

Educational institutions established in 1938
Girls' schools in London
Grammar schools in the London Borough of Sutton
1938 establishments in England
Academies in the London Borough of Sutton